Mohamed Hamed Al-lal (born 25 March 1979), known as Aloisio, is a Spanish retired footballer who played as a central defender.

Club career
Born in Melilla, Aloisio made his senior debut with Real Valladolid B in the 1997–98 season, in Segunda División B. One year later he moved to Segunda División's CF Extremadura, but failed to appear in any competitive matches for the club during his two-year tenure.

Aloisio spent the vast majority of his career in the lower leagues, representing FC Andorra, CF Reus Deportiu, CE Constància, Mérida UD, CF Fuenlabrada, CD Ourense, Sangonera Atlético CF, CF Atlético Ciudad and CD Badajoz. While with the latter team, he scored a career-best eight goals in 2010–11's third level, including a hat-trick in a 3–1 home win against CD Lugo on 27 March 2011.

On 26 January 2012, Aloisio signed with CD Alcoyano of the second division. He made his professional debut on 11 February one month shy of his 33rd birthday, starting in a 2–0 home victory over UD Las Palmas, and he netted his first goal on 3 March but in a 3–4 away loss to Villarreal CF B.

Aloisio moved abroad for the first time in his career on 18 September 2012, agreeing to a contract at Romanian Liga I side FC Ceahlăul Piatra Neamț. In the following summer he returned to  his country, joining UD Melilla.

Aloisio retired at the end of the 2013–14 campaign at the age of 35, and joined the coaching staff of compatriot Ángel Pérez García at Polish club Piast Gliwice.

References

External links

1979 births
Living people
Spanish sportspeople of Moroccan descent
Spanish footballers
Moroccan footballers
Footballers from Melilla
Association football defenders
Segunda División players
Segunda División B players
Tercera División players
AD Ceuta footballers
Real Valladolid Promesas players
CF Extremadura footballers
FC Andorra players
CF Reus Deportiu players
CE Constància players
Mérida UD footballers
CF Fuenlabrada footballers
CD Ourense footballers
CD Badajoz players
CD Alcoyano footballers
UD Melilla footballers
Liga I players
CSM Ceahlăul Piatra Neamț players
Spanish expatriate footballers
Expatriate footballers in Romania
Spanish expatriate sportspeople in Romania